Saint-Julien-Labrousse (Vivaro-Alpine: Sant Julian de la Brossa) is a former commune in the Ardèche department in southern France. On 1 January 2019, it was merged into the new commune Belsentes.

Population

See also
Communes of the Ardèche department

References

Former communes of Ardèche
Ardèche communes articles needing translation from French Wikipedia
Populated places disestablished in 2019